Moodswing or Moodswings may refer to:
 any rapid change in mood
 and, in particular, rapid changes in mood in mood disorders
 Moodswing (Joshua Redman album), 1994
 Moodswing (Kacy Crowley album), 2003
 Moodswings (band), the musical duo of Grant Showbiz and James F.T. Hood, active from 1992 to the present
 "Moodswings (To Come at Me like That)", a single by Charlotte Church
 ”Moodswings” a song by 5 Seconds Of Summer from 5SOS5